The Karnataka State Film Awards 2005–06, presented by Government of Karnataka, to felicitate the best of Kannada Cinema released in the year 2005.

Lifetime achievement award

Jury 

A committee headed by T. N. Seetharam was appointed to evaluate the feature films awards.

Film Awards

Other Awards

References

Karnataka State Film Awards